Architect Musa Mohammed Sada (born 25 February 1957) was appointed Nigerian Minister of Mines & Steel Development on 6 April 2010, when Acting President Goodluck Jonathan announced his new cabinet.

Sada was born on February 25, 1957, in Mani, Katsina State. 
He attended Ahmadu Bello University (ABU), Zaria and gained a B.SC in 1982 and M.Sc in Architecture in 1984. He earned an MBA from ABU in 1998. 
He practiced as a professional architect until being appointed Commissioner of Works, Housing and Transportation for Katsina State in 2007.

References

л

1957 births
Living people
Federal ministers of Nigeria
Ahmadu Bello University alumni
People from Katsina State
20th-century Nigerian architects
21st-century Nigerian architects